Fazıl Ahmet Aykaç (24 July 1884, Constantinople – 5 December 1967) was a Turkish poet, educator, civil servant, government minister and politician.

Biography 
Fazıl Ahmet's civil service life starts just before the Second Constitutional Era. He worked in the Nazaread Mekâtib-i Ecnebiyye (Ministry of Education). After the Second Constitutional Era, he started to teach in the Dâr'ül-Muallimîn-i Âliye with the proposal of the Ministry of Education. He followed this up with teaching at various local and foreign schools in Constantinople. In 1918, after a short time working in the Düyûn-ı Umumiye (Ottoman Public Debt Administration), he returned to work as an educator. Fazıl Ahmet has taught various courses such as Turkish literature, ethics, philosophy, pedagogy, psychology, French and translation. He died in 1967.

References

1884 births
1967 deaths
Politicians from Istanbul
Republican People's Party (Turkey) politicians